Stark Mad is a 1929 American pre-Code adventure film produced and distributed by Warner Bros., directed by Lloyd Bacon, and starring H. B. Warner, Louise Fazenda, Jacqueline Logan and Henry B. Walthall. This lurid jungle melodrama was an attempt to emulate the then-popular jungle horror films being made at the time by Tod Browning and Lon Chaney. The film was unusual in that it is set in the jungles of Central America rather than Africa.

Plot
James Rutherford has organized an expedition to the jungles of Central America to find his missing son, Bob, and his guide, Simpson. Professor Dangerfield intercepts the party, bringing with him Simpson, whose experiences in the jungle have made him a raving maniac. They go ashore and decide to spend the night at a Mayan temple. After Bob's fiancée Irene disappears, they come across a large ape chained to the temple floor, and Captain Rhodes, commander of the yacht, is abducted by a strange monster with great hairy talons. Messages are found warning the party to leave. Sewald, an explorer, is mysteriously killed by an arrow. Simpson's sanity returns, and he saves the party, revealing in flashback that he had lost his mind after murdering an old demented hermit who had been living in the ruins, because the fiend had murdered Rutherford's son Bob two months before.

Cast
H. B. Warner as Professor Dangerfield
Louise Fazenda as Mrs. Fleming
Jacqueline Logan as Irene
Henry B. Walthall as Captain Rhodes
Claude Gillingwater as James Rutherford
John Miljan as Dr. Milo
Andre Beranger as Simpson, a guide
Warner Richmond as First mate
Lionel Belmore as Amos Sewald
Charles Gemora as Gorilla (uncredited)

Preservation status
The film was released in both a sound version and a silent version for theaters not converted to sound. Both sound and silent versions are lost. The soundtrack, which was recorded separately on Vitaphone disks, may survive in private hands.

See also
The Lost World (1925)
King Kong (1933)

References

External links
 

1929 films
Lost American films
Films directed by Lloyd Bacon
Warner Bros. films
American black-and-white films
American adventure films
1929 adventure films
1929 lost films
Lost adventure films
1920s English-language films
1920s American films